Rock Hill (not to be confused with the town of Rock Hill, Florida) is a high point in Florida. This hill is located in Walton County, Florida. The hill is 193 feet high. Its exact location is 30°36'2"N 86°6'22"W.

In addition to Rock Hill, Walton County is also home to Britton Hill, the highest point in Florida. They are located in one of the only piedmont areas of the state.

Hills of Florida
Landforms of Walton County, Florida